The uncommon English surname Rolfe derives ultimately from the Old Scandinavian and Germanic pre 5th century personal name "Hrodwulf". This was composed of the elements "hrod", meaning "renown", and "wulf", a wolf. In Norse the contracted form was "Hrolfr", in Danish and Swedish "Rolf", and it is said that these personal names reached England first through their popularity with Scandinavian settlers before the Norman Conquest of 1066. The Normans thereafter introduced their own form of the name, generally found as "Rou" or "Roul" and often Latinised as "Rollo".

B. A. Rolfe, movie producer
Chris Rolfe, American soccer player
Frederick Rolfe, also known as "Baron Corvo"
Guy Rolfe, English actor
James Rolfe (composer) (born 1961), Canadian composer
James Rolfe (filmmaker) (born 1980), The Angry Video Game Nerd
John Rolfe, English-born Virginia colonist
John Carew Rolfe, classicist
Lilian Rolfe, female World War II spy
Louis Rolfe, British track cyclist
Louisa Rolfe, British senior police officer
Red Rolfe, American baseball player
Rob Rolfe, drummer in English post-hardcore band Enter Shikari
Robert Allen Rolfe (1855–1921), British botanist
Thomas Rolfe, child of Lady Rebecca and John Rolfe 
William James Rolfe (1827–1910), American Shakespearean scholar

References

See also
 Rolf
 Rolph
Surnames from given names